John McVicker (29 April 1868 –  1940) was an Irish footballer who played in the Football League for Accrington and Ardwick. He also represented the Ireland national team.

References

External links

English Football League players
1868 births
1940 deaths
Glentoran F.C. players
Linfield F.C. players
Birmingham St George's F.C. players
Accrington F.C. players
Manchester City F.C. players
Macclesfield Town F.C. players
Association football fullbacks
Association football forwards
Irish association footballers (before 1923)
Pre-1950 IFA international footballers